Red sauce may refer to:

 Marinara sauce, in the United States
 Ketchup, in the United Kingdom and Ireland
 Salsa roja, in Mexican cuisine
 Red curry, in Thai cuisine